The simple-station Calle 76 is part of the TransMilenio mass-transit system of Bogotá, Colombia, opened in the year 2000.

Location

The station is located in northern Bogotá, specifically on Avenida Caracas, between Calles 74 and 76.

History

In 2000, phase one of the TransMilenio system was opened between Portal de la 80 and Tercer Milenio, including this station.

The station is named Calle 76 due to its proximity to the arterial route of the same name.

It serves the demand of the Porcúncula, Juan XXIII, Lago Gaitán and San Felipe neighborhoods.
Points of interest near the station include the Unilago technology shopping center and the Centro de Alta Tecnología.

Since its opening, it has been the most congested simple station, receiving over 600,000 users daily. This congestion has been reduced due to the Expreso 140, which began service in February 2006, alleviating the need of users coming from Autopista Norte to Calle 80 to transfer at this station, notably improving the quality of service.

On May 15, 2012, near the station, there was an explosion. According to the latest version, the explosive device was placed by a man who was on foot and stuck a limpet-type pump in the driver's door of the Humvee in which he was carrying former Interior and Justice Minister Fernando Londono. The total balance of the attack were 2 deaths, more than 19 injured and incalculable moral and material damages.

In the early morning of May 27, 2014, the attacks against this station were registered. On that occasion, the stations Flores (TransMilenio) and Calle 76 were destroyed at the point of guns of balinese, where they left $ 40 million pesos in losses.

Station Services

Old trunk services

Main Line Service

Feeder routes

This station does not have connections to feeder routes.

Inter-city service

This station does not have inter-city service.

External links
TransMilenio
suRumbo.com

See also
Bogotá
TransMilenio
List of TransMilenio Stations

TransMilenio